Nemesis: The Best of & Reworked is a best of compilation album, from the German futurepop band Blutengel. All the tracks on the first disc are re-recorded. The deluxe edition second disc features songs released between 2005 and 2015. In the collectors box set, there is also a DVD of all the music videos released to date. Weg Zu Mir was released as a preview for Nemesis on their 2015 In Alle Ewigkeit EP. All tracks are taken from all albums and EPs, with the exception of Demon Kiss.
Two lyric videos were released, Children of the Night (Reworked) preceding the release by a week, and Soul of Ice (Reworked) on the day of the album's release. On 19 February, Children of the Night (Reworked) was also made available to download from the album.

Track listing

Credits
 Music and male vocals: Chris Pohl
 Female vocals: Ulrike Goldmann

References

External links
Musicfolio.com

2016 compilation albums
Blutengel albums